Franz Santos Pumaren (born December 5, 1963) is a Filipino former professional basketball player and coach. He played college ball for De La Salle University before playing professional basketball in the Philippine Basketball Association. He is the former coach of the Adamson Falcons in the UAAP. He is also the incumbent congressman from Quezon City's 3rd district.

Basketball career
Pumaren played most of his professional career for the San Miguel Beermen where he won 9 championships with the team which also included the 1989 Grand Slam. He also played for the Mobiline Cellulars.

Pumaren formerly coached the De La Salle Green Archers from 1998 to 2009 where he led them to five men's basketball championships including a four-peat from 1998 to 2001, and his final championship with the team in 2007. As a coach for the Archers, he was known for implementing the full court press defense on opposing teams.

Pumaren is the head coach of the Air21 Express in the PBA, starting at the 2011-12 PBA season.

In December 2015, Pumaren appointed as the head coach of the Adamson Falcons men's basketball team in the UAAP, replacing Mike Fermin who was named as the assistant coach.·

Months after his appointment as Adamson's head coach, Pumaren joined the GlobalPort Batang Pier coaching staff as a head consultant of the team.

Political career
Pumaren is also a politician from the 3rd District of Quezon City. The district includes the Araneta Coliseum, where majority of the PBA and UAAP games are held, and the campus of the Ateneo de Manila University, the rival of his alma mater, De La Salle University.

He first served as councilor for three consecutive terms from 2001 to 2010. He then resigned as La Salle coach in order to run for the 3rd district's seat in the House of Representatives. However, he lost to fellow councilor Jorge "Bolet" Banal Jr., coming at third behind defeated incumbent Matias Defensor Jr. with 28% of the vote.

He returned to the Quezon City Council when he was elected in 2013. He was re-elected in 2016 and 2019. He ran for representative at the 3rd district for the second time in 2022 under the ticket of Mayor Joy Belmonte, successfully defeating incumbent representative Allan Benedict Reyes. On July 26, 2022, Pumaren was named as one of the Deputy Majority Leaders of the House of Representatives in the 19th Congress of the Philippines.

Coaching record

Collegiate record

Professional record

References

|-

1963 births
Living people
Basketball players at the 1994 Asian Games
Filipino men's basketball coaches
Nationalist People's Coalition politicians
Basketball players from Quezon City
Air21 Express coaches
Philippine Basketball Association All-Stars
Philippines men's national basketball team players
Filipino men's basketball players
Members of the House of Representatives of the Philippines from Quezon City
Quezon City Council members
National Unity Party (Philippines) politicians
San Miguel Beermen players
TNT Tropang Giga players
De La Salle Green Archers basketball players
Asian Games competitors for the Philippines
Filipino sportsperson-politicians
NorthPort Batang Pier coaches
Adamson Soaring Falcons basketball coaches
De La Salle Green Archers basketball coaches
Pop Cola Panthers coaches
Sta. Lucia Realtors coaches